Koettlitz can refer to:

 Reginald Koettlitz (1860–1916), British physician and polar explorer
Koettlitz Glacier, a glacier named after him in Antarctica
Koettlitz Névé, a névé named after him in Antarctica